John Medland Clark (1813-11 April, 1849) was an English architect briefly active in Ipswich, Suffolk before his promising career was cut short by a premature death at the age of 36. Nevertheless several of the buildings he designed still make a significant contribution to Ipswich's built environment.

Gallery

References

1813 births
1849 deaths
19th-century English architects